Sátorhely is a village in Baranya county, Hungary. It is the site of the 1526 Battle of Mohács.

Populated places in Baranya County